Sayed Mohamed may refer to:

 Sayed Mohamed (footballer) (born 1920), Egyptian footballer
 Sayed Mohamed Adnan (born 1983), Bahraini footballer
 Sayed Enga Mohamed (born  1985), Egyptian female weightlifter